Château de Hartmannswiller is a castle in the commune of Hartmannswiller, in the department of Haut-Rhin, Alsace, France. Although a castle was already mentioned in the 14th century, the present structure mainly dates from the 16th and 18th century. It is a listed historical monument since 1988.

References

Castles in Haut-Rhin
Monuments historiques of Haut-Rhin